The Exum Mountain Guides is a mountain guide service based in the U.S. state of Wyoming.  The guide service was founded in the 1926 by Paul Petzoldt and Glenn Exum, for whom the Exum Ridge climbing route on the Grand Teton in Grand Teton National Park is named. From their base in Grand Teton National Park near Jenny Lake, Exum Mountain Guides provide guided climbing trips throughout the Teton Range and in other nearby mountain ranges. Numerous climbers have worked for the guide service, some of which pioneered new climbing routes on other mountains all over the world.

Notable guides
 Willi Unsoeld
 Alex Lowe
 Steve House
 Rolando Garibotti
 Jim Bridwell
 Chuck Pratt
 Jim Donini

External links
 The Exum Mountain Guides official web site
 Exum Mountain Guides staff list
 Location of the Exum Summer Office

Mountain guides associations
Grand Teton National Park
Organizations based in Wyoming
Organizations established in 1926
1926 establishments in Wyoming